Lincoln Village is the name of some places in the United States:
Lincoln Village, California
Lincoln Village, Ohio
Lincoln Village, City of Milwaukee, Wisconsin A south side neighborhood of Milwaukee